Mount Rose is a 4,301-foot-elevation (1,311 meter) mountain summit located in the southeast portion of the Olympic Mountains, in Mason County of Washington state. It is situated in the Mount Skokomish Wilderness, on land managed by Olympic National Forest. Precipitation runoff from the mountain drains into Lake Cushman, and topographic relief is significant as the summit rises approximately 3,600 feet (1,100 m) above the lake in less than one mile. Old-growth forests of Douglas fir, western hemlock, and western redcedar grow on the slopes surrounding the peak. In 2006, the Bear Gulch Fire scorched 750 acres of forest on the slopes of Mount Rose from lake level to the summit. Access to the summit is via the 3.2-mile-long Mt. Rose Trail which gains 3,500 feet of elevation.

Climate

Mount Rose is located in the marine west coast climate zone of western North America. Most weather fronts originate in the Pacific Ocean, and travel east toward the Olympic Mountains. As fronts approach, they are forced upward by the peaks of the Olympic Range, causing them to drop their moisture in the form of rain or snowfall (Orographic lift). As a result, the Olympics experience high precipitation, especially during the winter months. During winter months, weather is usually cloudy, but due to high pressure systems over the Pacific Ocean that intensify during summer months, there is often little or no cloud cover during the summer. Because of maritime influence, snow tends to be wet and heavy, resulting in avalanche danger. The months April through October offer the most favorable weather for climbing or viewing the peak.

Etymology
The mountain's name has been officially adopted by the United States Board on Geographic Names to commemorate Alfred A. Rose, who was the first settler to the Lake Cushman area in 1885, where he farmed on 150 acres with his wife and three children. He died of smallpox in 1889.

Gallery

See also

 Geology of the Pacific Northwest
 Olympic Mountains

References

External links

 Mt. Rose photo: Flickr
 Mount Skokomish Wilderness U.S. Forest Service
 Mount Rose: Washington Trails Association

Rose
Rose
Rose
Rose
Rose